Pure is a 2005 Quebec film directed by Jim Donovan, written by Eugene Garcia, and starring Laura Jordan, Karen Simpson, Gianpaolo Venuta and Rachelle Lefevre. This was Jim Donovan's first feature film.

Plot
Misha seeks to escape her party-girl past and enroll in college.

Cast
 Laura Jordan as Misha
 Karen Simpson as Angie
 Gianpaolo Venuta as Josh
 Rachelle Lefevre as Julie
 Tim Rozon as Sam
 Abeille Gélinas as Sabrina

Release and reception
The movie was released on DVD in February 2006.

Awards and nominations
Jim Donovan was received a 2005 Directors Guild of Canada nomination for Pure. It also received Jury Prize for Best Photography at the 2005 Canadian Film Festival in Toronto.

References

External links
 
 

2005 films
Films directed by Jim Donovan
2005 action films
Canadian action films
English-language Canadian films
2000s English-language films
2000s Canadian films